The Encyclopaedia Sinica is a 1917 English-language encyclopedia on China and China-related subjects edited by English missionary Samuel Couling. It covers a range of topics and provides insight on early 20th century perspectives towards China. Commentators report that the work is still useful at the turn of the 21st century particularly to aid the understanding of the relationship between China and the United Kingdom.

External links 
 

Books about China
Sinica
Sinica
1917 non-fiction books
Chinese encyclopedias
Reference works in the public domain
20th-century encyclopedias